The 2000 Denmark Open in badminton was held in Farum, Copenhagen, from October 25 to October 29, 2000. It was a five-star tournament and the prize money was US$250,000.

Venue
Farum Hallen, Farum, Copenhagen

Final results

References

Denmark Open
Denmark